Sivapuram (also called Sivapuram Colony) is a small Village/hamlet in Minjur Block in Thiruvallur District of Tamil Nadu State, India. It comes under Aladu Panchayath. It is located 45 kilometers towards West from District head quarters Tiruvallur. 1 KM from Minjur. 34 kilometers from State capital Chennai. Pin code for Sivapuram is 601204 and postal head office is Ponneri.

Sivapuram comes under Ponneri State constituency and Thiruvallur parliament constituency.

Nearby cities 
Ponneri, Ambattur, Chennai and Thiruninravur are the nearby cities to Sivapuram.

Historical monument 
1000 years old Shri Rajarajeswaramudaiya Mahadevar Temple built by King Raja Raja Cholan is situated in Sivapuram. It is now maintained by the Archaeological department of India.

Co-ordinates 
13.05N,79.74E

Access 
Sivapuram lies on the road from Thiruvallur to Thakkolam. The nearest railway station is Ponneri.

References 

Villages in Tiruvallur district